The New Zealand End of Life Choice referendum was a binding referendum  held on 17 October 2020, with early voting taking place from 3 October, in conjunction with the 2020 general election and cannabis referendum, on the question of whether the End of Life Choice Act 2019 should come into force. The Act would legalise voluntary euthanasia for those with a terminal illness and less than six months left to live, if confirmed to be eligible by two doctors.
New Zealand is the first country to put euthanasia legalisation to a referendum.

As the majority of voters support the legislation, the bill came into force on 7 November 2021, 12 months after the final vote count was announced.
Preliminary results for the referendum were released by the Electoral Commission on 30 October 2020, and official results were released on 6 November 2020. In the final results, 65.1% of people supported the End of Life Choice Act while 33.7% were opposed.

Background 

Euthanasia was illegal in New Zealand, with it being illegal to "aid and abet suicide" under section 179 of the Crimes Act 1961. Two earlier attempts to legalise euthanasia failed to get through the New Zealand Parliament. Hawkes Bay National MP Michael Laws' 1995 Death with Dignity Bill failed by 61 votes against and 29 supporting, and NZ First MP Peter Brown's 2003 Death with Dignity Bill failed in its first reading by 60 votes opposing to 58 supporting.

ACT party MP David Seymour entered the End of Life Choice Bill to the member's bill ballot in October 2015. The bill passed its first reading 76–44 in December 2017 and its second reading 70–50 in June 2019. In the committee of the whole House, support from the New Zealand First party became conditional on a referendum on whether the law should come into force. An amendment to require a referendum passed 69–51. The bill passed its third reading 69–51 on 13 November and it received royal assent on 16 November 2019, becoming the End of Life Choice Act 2019.

Referendum structure 

The referendum asked voters:

The two options were:
 "Yes, I support the End of Life Choice Act 2019 coming into force."
 "No, I do not support the End of Life Choice Act 2019 coming into force."

If the majority of voters support the legislation, it will come into force 12 months after the final vote count is announced. If the majority oppose the legislation in the referendum (or any subsequent referendum, if the first is voided), it will not come into force and will be repealed by 16 November 2024, five years after it received the royal assent.

Public opinion 
Support for assisted dying since 2000 has averaged at around 68%. During the 16-month-long select committee stage of the End of Life Choice Bill, 39,000 public submissions were made, with 90% of submitters opposed to it. Over one thousand doctors signed an open letter in mid-2019 saying that they "want no part in assisted suicide".

Campaigning and endorsements 
The rules regarding campaigning for the referendum are generally the same as for the general election. All advertisements must carry a promoter statement, stating the name and physical address of the promoter. It is illegal to campaign on polling day, or within a  radius of an advance polling booth.

During the regulated period, which runs from 18 August to 16 October 2020, promoters have to declare their campaign expenses and there are limits on how much they may spend on referendum campaigning. The maximum expense limit is $338,000 per referendum for those promoters registered with the Electoral Commission, and $13,600 per referendum for unregistered promoters.

Results 

Unlike the general election, a preliminary count for the cannabis and euthanasia referendums was not conducted on election night (17 October 2020). Instead, the referendum votes was counted alongside the mandatory election recount.

All voting papers, counterfoils and electoral rolls are returned to the electorate's returning officer for counting. During the count, the returning officer will approve and count any special votes, and compile a master electoral roll to ensure no-one has voted more than once. Special votes include votes from those who enrolled after the deadline of 13 September, those who voted outside their electorate (this includes all overseas votes), voters in hospital or prison, and those voters enrolled on the unpublished roll. To simplify processing and counting, overseas votes will be sent to and counted at the Electoral Commission's central processing centre in Wellington, rather than to electorate returning officers.

Preliminary results for the referendums were released by the Electoral Commission on 30 October 2020. These results had 65.2% of people in support of the legislation.

Following the counting of the 480,000 special votes, official results for the general election and referendums were released on 6 November. Based on the final results, 65.1% of people supported the legislation while 33.7% opposed it.

The new legislation took effect on 7 November 2021.

By polling place location
As each polling place had only one ballot box for ordinary referendum votes, ordinary votes were broken down by the general electorate where the polling place was located. Special votes were broken down by electorate. Both ordinary and special votes have been combined in the following table.

References

External links 
 

2020 referendums
Euthanasia referendum
2020 referendum
Euthanasia referendum
2020 euthanasia
Referendums postponed due to the COVID-19 pandemic